12 Desperate Hours is a film adapted from Ann Rule's Last Chance, Last Dance true crime collection. The film is directed by Gina Gershon and stars Samantha Mathis, Harrison Thomas, and David Conrad.

Synopsis
The film follows Val (Samantha Mathis), a mother who finds herself and her young children who are being held hostage by Denny (Harrison Thomas) when he breaks into her house after committing murder earlier that day. In order to save them and her husband Mark (David Conrad), who should arrive soon, Val offers to drive Denny wherever he wants and becomes his unwilling accomplice as he goes on a path of destruction. Despite the traumatic events, Val builds a friendship with her kidnapper and uses the relationship to help save the lives of bystanders, herself and even the life of her kidnapper.

Cast
 Samantha Mathis as Val Jane
 Harrison Thomas as Denny Tuohmy
 David Conrad as Mark Jane
 Tali Rabinowitz as Cherie
 Tina Alexis Allen as Francine
 Ben Cain as Sergeant David Corbin
 Jesse C. Boyd as Jessie
 Hannah Dunne as Carolee

References